Ralston College is a non-accredited institution of higher education that offers in-person degree programs as well as online programs. It began its first in-person offering, an MA in the Humanities, in autumn of 2022 with the authority to grant degrees. Its first semester included Greek language learning in Greece. Its curriculum focuses on the liberal arts, and it has declared a commitment to freedom of speech, enshrined in its motto "sermo liber vita ipsa" ("Free Speech is Life Itself"). Its first short course, run in conjunction with the FutureLearn platform, is on Samuel Johnson’s Rasselas and led by critic Anthony Daniels. Other programs it offers include its symposia.

History 
In 2006, Stephen Blackwood and James Atkins Pritchard came to believe that the reform of higher education they sought could not happen within existing universities, and that only new institutions could break free from what they believed to be an ideological status quo and corruption that exists within modern universities. The pair began fundraising for their vision of establishing an institution of higher education. Early supporters included philosopher Hilary Putnam, literary critic Harold Bloom, and Nobel Laureate Elie Wiesel.

Late in 2020, Ralston College received the power to grant degrees from the State of Georgia, and was authorized for operation. Ralston launched its first online degree program shortly after. In May 2022, Ralston College appointed Jordan Peterson as its Chancellor. Among the members of its board of visitors are Vernon Smith, Heather Mac Donald, Harry Lewis, Ruth Wisse, Roger Kimball, and Jordan Peterson. Also, Freeman Dyson, Sir Roger Scruton, and Harold Bloom were listed as visitors of Ralston College before their deaths. Ralston's first class of 24 in-person students began their first semester in the fall of 2022. Ralston College now accepts students of all ages and backgrounds to study, both in person and remotely online.

References

External Links 

 Official website

Universities and colleges in Savannah, Georgia
Private universities and colleges in Georgia (U.S. state)